Bill Schade is a former American football coach.  He was the 13th head football coach at Adams State College—now known as Adams State University—in Alamosa, Colorado and he held that position for three seasons, from 1974 until 1976.  His coaching record at Adams State was 14–13.

Head coaching record

References

Year of birth missing (living people)
Living people
Adams State Grizzlies football coaches